FK Pobeda is a football club based in the city of Prilep, North Macedonia.

History
The club was founded in 1941 as Goce Delčev and renamed in 1950 to FK Pobeda. FK Pobeda has been a winner of Macedonian First League for two times (eight times as Republic League in Yugoslavia), and Macedonian Football Cup for one time (eight times as Republic Cup in Yugoslavia). Their first great period was the 1950s, when they won the Republic Cup for the first time in 1951. One year later Pobeda won its first championship title in 1952 and in 1954 the second one. They waited for 4 years for their next trophy they won the Republic Cup for the second time in 1958. Next year 1959 they became champions of SR Macedonia again. They continued with their winning series in the 1960s. Pobeda won its 3rd cup in 1960, and again the cup masters won their 4th cup in 1961. Next year it was time for a new championship title in 1962, and then the duble crown in 1963. Last trophy in the 1960s was 1964 Republic Cup for the 6th time. In the late 1960s and early 1970s Pobeda had a stagnation period although it was on the top most of the time and they played pretty good in the cup too. Finally after 13 years Pobeda won again, and again it was the Macedonian Republic Cup in 1977 for the 7th time. Two years after Pobeda was back on track winning its 5th title after 16 years waiting. Two years after in 1981 Pobeda did it again 7th time champion of SR Macedonia. The 1980s was their last good period and they won their 8th championship title in 1986. Next year it was time to win the cup again and they did it for the 8th time in 1987 (and last time in the part of Yugoslavia).

The period of the 1990s, after an independence of Macedonia, didn't bring much excitement for the Pobeda's fans and they had to wait for better times. The beginning of the 2000s was a good sign and the long period of waiting was over. In 2002 it was time to win the Macedonian Football Cup for the first and only time. Two years later the club was won the champions title in 2004 for the first time since of the Macedonia's independence. They didn't wait for long to win their second, 3 years later in 2007 Pobeda was champion again and for the last time. Also, Pobeda has represented Macedonia for ten times in the European Football Cups. On March 27, 2009, UEFA, the governing body of football in Europe, charged FK Pobeda over match fixing allegations relating to a Champions League qualifying match against FC Pyunik of Armenia in 2004 They were subsequently found guilty and banned from UEFA competitions for eight years. The next season in which they will be eligible to compete is 2017–18. In April 2017, their suspension was expired and Pobeda will be returning to the Macedonian leagues soon.

A successor club which claims rights to Pobeda's honours and records was established in 2010 under the name Viktorija, later renamed to Pobeda Junior and then to the name of the original club. However, they are not legally considered to be successors to the original Pobeda and the two clubs' track records and honours are kept separate by the Football Federation of Macedonia.

Rivalries
The club's biggest rivals are Pelister, and matches between the teams are called the Derby of Pelagonia (geographical region in Macedonia).

Supporters
FK Pobeda supporters were called Majmuni (Monkeys).

Honours
 Macedonian Republic League:
Winners (8): 1952, 1954, 1959, 1962, 1963, 1979, 1981, 1986
 Macedonian First League:
Winners (2): 2003–04, 2006–07
Runners-up (2): 1996–97, 1999–2000
 Macedonian Republic Cup:
Winners (8): 1951, 1958, 1960, 1961, 1963, 1964, 1977, 1987
 Macedonian Football Cup:
Winners (1): 2001–02
Runners-up (2): 1999–2000, 2006–07

Seasons

Pobeda in Europe

Historical list of coaches

 Ilija Dimoski (1993 – 1994)
 Dragi Kanatlarovski (1994 – 1996)
 Lazar Plačkov
 Dragi Kanatlarovski (1999)
 Krume Mitrikeski (2000)
 Nikola Ilievski (Jul 2000 – Dec 2000)
 Mirsad Jonuz (Jan 2001 – Jun 2002)
 Zoran Smileski (Jul 2002 – Dec 2002)
 Dragi Kanatlarovski (Jan 2003 – 2004)
 Nikola Ilievski (2004)
 Dragi Hristovski (Jun 2004– Sep  2004)
 Petar Kurćubić (3 Oct 2004 - Sep 2005)
 Nikolče Zdravevski (28 Sep 2005 – Feb 2009)
 Nebojša Petrović (1 Mar 2009 - Apr 2009)
 Goran Todoroski (29 Apr 2009 – Jun 2010)

See also
2009 European football betting scandal

References

External links
FK Pobeda blog 
Supporters Website 
info at MacedonianFootball 
Football Federation of Macedonia 

 
Association football clubs established in 1941
Football clubs in Yugoslavia
1941 establishments in Yugoslavia
Football clubs in Prilep